Aaron Nicolás Molinas (born 2 August 2000) is an Argentine footballer currently playing as a midfielder for Tigre.

Career statistics

Club

Notes

Honours
Boca Juniors
Copa de la Liga Profesional: 2022

References

2000 births
Living people
Argentine footballers
Argentina under-20 international footballers
Association football midfielders
Argentine Primera División players
Boca Juniors footballers
People from La Matanza Partido
Sportspeople from Buenos Aires Province
Argentine sportspeople of Paraguayan descent